The Roatán skink (Marisora roatanae) is a species of skink found on Roatán in Honduras.

References

Marisora
Reptiles described in 2012
Reptiles of Honduras
Endemic fauna of Honduras
Taxa named by Stephen Blair Hedges
Taxa named by Caitlin E. Conn